Juan Francisco Rodríguez Herrera (born 10 May 1965), known as Juanito, is a Spanish former professional footballer who played as a central defender.

Club career
Juanito was born in Santa Cruz de Tenerife, Canary Islands. He made his professional debut in the 1984–85 season with UD Las Palmas, appearing in 30 Segunda División matches en route to a La Liga promotion.

During a 16-year senior career, Juanito amassed totals of 462 games and 39 goals, 385 in the top division alone, scoring in every campaign but two and also representing Real Zaragoza (13 goals for the Aragonese over two seasons, mainly through his main asset, a powerful shot), Atlético Madrid, Sevilla FC and CF Extremadura. With Atlético, he was a relatively important defensive unit as they won back-to-back Copa del Rey tournaments in the early 1990s.

After retiring in 2000, Juanito acted as both chairman and general manager for last club Extremadura. Subsequently, he returned to Las Palmas as director of football but, in late March 2006, was appointed interim coach after the dismissal of Josip Višnjić, with the Canary Islands side eventually returning to the second tier after an absence of two years.

On 14 June 2009, after a further 46 matches as a manager and one full season as sporting director – the team finished in 18th position, just one above the relegation zone – Juanito left Las Palmas.

International career
Juanito made his debut for Spain on 15 November 1989, starting in a 4–0 home win against Hungary for the 1990 FIFA World Cup qualifiers in a match played in Seville. He scored the third goal from a free kick, being eventually overlooked for the squad that contested the final stages in Italy by manager Luis Suárez and earning a total of five caps.

Honours
Las Palmas
Segunda División: 1984–85

Atlético Madrid
Copa del Rey: 1990–91, 1991–92

References

External links

1965 births
Living people
Spanish footballers
Footballers from Santa Cruz de Tenerife
Association football defenders
La Liga players
Segunda División players
UD Las Palmas players
Real Zaragoza players
Atlético Madrid footballers
Sevilla FC players
CF Extremadura footballers
Spain international footballers
Spanish football managers
Segunda División managers
Segunda División B managers
UD Las Palmas managers